Pedro Velarde y Santillán (25 October 1779 – 2 May 1808) was a Spanish artillery captain famous for his heroic death in the Dos de Mayo uprisings against the French occupation of Madrid. He became a popular hero and martyr figure for Spain's subsequent War of Independence from the French Empire.

Born to a Cantabrian family in Muriedas, Camargo, Velarde enrolled in the Artillery College (Colegio de Artillería) at the Alcázar de Segovia in 1793. He graduated near the top of his class and was promoted to Sub-Lieutenant in 1799. He fought in the War of the Oranges against Portugal in 1800 and was promoted to Lieutenant in 1801.

Velarde returned to the Artillery College after the war and worked as an instructor of mathematics and ballistics, in which he became something of an expert. In 1806 he was made a secretary of the Artillery Corps' Junta Superior Económica and established himself in Madrid.

When the mass uprisings broke out against the French occupiers on May 2, 1808, Velarde took up arms and rallied his men. Acting on orders from the local junta, Velarde led 37 soldiers to defend the Monteleón artillery barracks against the French. Velarde, along with his comrade Luís Daoíz de Torres and most of his soldiers, fell in the day's heavy fighting in which hundreds died. He was 28 years old.

The name of one of the two lions standing at the Congreso de los Diputados is Velarde. The other lion's name is Daoiz.

His body was recovered from the battlefield and carried off to a burial. Velarde's epic last stand, immortalized in artwork and monuments, assured him a central place in the pantheon of heroes from the national resistance to Napoleon that has since formed part of Spain's national mythology.

External links
Biography of Pedro Velarde

1779 births
1808 deaths
People from Camargo, Cantabria
Military personnel from Cantabria
Spanish commanders of the Napoleonic Wars
Spanish military personnel killed in action